Hecking is a German language surname. Notable people with the name include:
 Dieter Hecking (1964), German football manager
 Kelly Hecking (1980), American former backstroke and freestyle competition swimmer

References 

German-language surnames